Mr. Vocalist is the sixth studio album by American singer-songwriter Eric Martin. Released on November 26, 2008 exclusively in Japan by Sony Music Japan, the album features Martin's English-language covers of popular female-oriented Japanese songs.

The album peaked at No. 12 on Oricon's albums chart.

Mr. Vocalist was released in Hong Kong as Mr. Vocalist (Asian Version) on March 9, 2009. This version features a different track listing with six tracks replaced with songs from Mr. Vocalist 2.

Track listing

Charts

See also
 Ms. Vocalist - a 2010 cover album by Debbie Gibson, featuring male-oriented J-pop songs.

References

External links
 
 
 

2008 albums
Eric Martin (musician) albums
Sony Music Entertainment Japan albums
Covers albums